Towers Watson & Co. was a global professional services firm. Its principal lines of business were risk management and human resource consulting. It also had actuarial and investment consulting practices.

In January 2016, Towers Watson merged with Willis Group to form Willis Towers Watson.

Overview 
Towers Watson was formed on January 4, 2010, by the merger of Towers Perrin and Watson Wyatt Worldwide. The merger created the world's largest employee-benefits consulting firm by revenue. Towers Watson has 14,000 employees in 35 countries and is expected to have revenue of US$3.6 billion per year.  Towers Watson's chief executive officer and chairman of the board is John Haley, the former CEO of Watson Wyatt. The firm's first chief operating officer, president, and deputy chairman was Mark Mactas, the former CEO of Towers Perrin.

History
Towers Watson is the successor to R. Watson & Sons, which was formed in the UK in 1878. B. E. Wyatt founded The Wyatt Company as an actuarial consulting firm in the USA with seven co-founders in 1946. The two firms formed a global alliance under the brand Watson Wyatt Worldwide in 1995 and formally merged in August 2005.

Towers, Perrin, Forster & Crosby was established in the U.S. in 1934: in 1987, the company shortened its name to Towers Perrin.

On June 28, 2009, the two firms announced they would merge, pending approval by shareholders and regulatory agencies, in a merger of equals. Regulatory approval was granted by anti-trust divisions of the U.S. and the E.U., and stock-owners overwhelmingly approved the merger in separate meetings on December 18.

In November 2010, Towers Watson signed a definitive agreement to acquire EMB Consultancy. EMB specialized in property & casualty consulting. EMB also had software dealing with pricing, reserving, spatial smoothing analysis, capital and risk modelling. The deal was completed as of February 1, 2011.

Merger 

On June 30, 2015, Towers Watson announced it would merge with Willis Group to create Willis Towers Watson. The combined company operates in 140 countries, with a workforce of approximately 43,000 employees, revenues of $8.2 billion and a value of $18 billion. This merger was approved by both firms' shareholders on December 11, 2015. The merger was concluded on January 5, 2016, after all regulatory approvals were received.

References

External links
 

Companies formerly listed on the Nasdaq
Actuarial firms
Consulting firms established in 2010
International management consulting firms
Management consulting firms of the United States
Human resource management consulting firms
2010 establishments in Virginia